Birch River may refer to:

Canada 
Birch River (Alberta), a river
Birch River, Manitoba, a community

United States 
Birch River (Alaska), a river by Central House
Birch River (Maine), a river in Aroostook County, Maine
Birch River (Minnesota), a river of Minnesota
Birch River (West Virginia)
Birch River, West Virginia, an unincorporated community located on the river